The "Royal Air Force March Past" is the official march of the Royal Air Force (RAF) and is used in some other Commonwealth air forces.

The original score was completed by Walford Davies in 1918 for the new RAF. It combined the rhythm of the bugle call of the Royal Flying Corps with that of the Royal Naval Air Service. The call appears in both the introduction and the coda. It was originally known as the Adastral I (in reference to the RAF's motto).  The second part of the march past, the trio, was composed by Sir George Dyson.

The march can be played both as a slow march and a quick march, and has been used as both when the Queen's Colour Squadron and RAF bands perform public duties such as mounting the guard at Buckingham Palace.

Canadian version
Authority was granted in February 1943 by His Majesty's Stationery Office to publish the "RAF March Past" piece in Canada under the title "RCAF March Past". It was the official march of the Royal Canadian Air Force until the unification of the Canadian Armed Forces in 1968.  It continued to be the authorized march of Air Command and the Air Operations Branch of the Canadian Forces from 1968-2011.  In 2011 Air Command reverted its name to Royal Canadian Air Force and the RCAF March Past continues as the official march of the RCAF.  It is also the official march of the Royal Canadian Air Cadets and the Air Force Association of Canada.

A pipe band arrangement was composed in the 1950s by Pipe Major Alex Howie of the CFB Trenton Pipe Band, and a trio for pipes was composed in 1970 by Pipe Major Archie Cairns.

Lyrics

The following are the lyrics to be sung to the Trio section of the march (composed by George Dyson). It references the motto of the RAF, "Per Ardua Ad Astra" (Latin, "Through adversity to the stars").

RAF March Past
Through adversities we'll conquer. 
Blaze into the stars, 
A trail of glory 
We'll live on land and sea 
'Til victory is won. 
Men in blue skies are winging 
In each heart one thought is ringing. 
Fight for the right, 
God is our might, 
We shall be free.

Audio samples
 Audio of the RAF March Past
 RCAF March Past on Youtube

References

Tracy, Robert. "Our Symbols - A Historical Link With Our Air Force Roots". Air Force Magazine. Vol. 22, No. 3. 1998. ISSN 0704-6804. pp. 94–96.
 Air Force Association of Canada. Air Force on the March! CD liner notes.

British military marches
Royal Air Force March Past
Royal Air Force music
1918 compositions
Songs about aviators